Dank or DANK may refer to:
 Dank (horse), a British-trained thoroughbred racehorse
 Dank (surname), a surname
 Dank, Romania, a village in the commune of Aghireșu, Romania
 DANK Haus German American Cultural Center, a cultural organization in Chicago, Illinois, U.S.
 Dank meme, an Internet meme that is said to be "cool" or "awesome"
 Dank (cannabis), a slang name for cannabis or marijuana
 Deutsch Amerikanischer National Kongress (German American National Congress)

See also
 Danker, a surname
 Danks, a surname